Tiradentes (1746–1792) was a Brazilian hero of the Independence Movement.

Tiradentes may also refer to:

Places 
 Tiradentes, Minas Gerais, a city in the state Minas Gerais, Brazil
 Tiradentes do Sul, a municipality in the state Rio Grande do Sul, Brazil
 Tiradentes (São Paulo Metro), a station on Line 1 (Blue) of the São Paulo Metro

Sports 
 Grêmio Esportivo Tiradentes, a Brazilian football (soccer) club
 Sociedade Esportiva Tiradentes, a Brazilian football (soccer) club
 Associação Esportiva Tiradentes, a Brazilian football (soccer) club